The obliquus capitis inferior muscle is the larger of the two oblique muscles of the neck. It arises from the apex of the spinous process of the axis and passes laterally and slightly upward, to be inserted into the lower and back part of the transverse process of the atlas.

It lies deep to the semispinalis capitis and trapezius muscles.

The muscle is responsible for rotation of the head and first cervical vertebra (atlanto-axial joint).

It forms the lower boundary of the suboccipital triangle of the neck.

The naming of this muscle may be confusing, as it is the only capitis (L. "head") muscle that does not attach to the cranium.

Function 
The obliquus capitis inferior muscle, like the other suboccipital muscles, has an important role in proprioception. This muscle has a very high density of Golgi organs and muscle spindles which accounts for this. It is believed that proprioception may be the primary role of the inferior oblique (and indeed the other suboccipital muscles) allowing accurate positioning of the head on the neck.

Additional Images

References

External links

Muscles of the head and neck